Georgia Fudge (also known as Georgia Miller) was one of the first professional female bodybuilders in the early 1980s. At a height of 5 ft 8 in, she competed at a bodyweight of around 125–130 lb.

Georgia Fudge is in Florida. While she no longer models, she remains active in the fitness and wellness industry. She is a certified personal trainer with over three decades of fitness experience. She trains men and women at the LA Fitness several days every week. She has also previously competed and trained under the names of Georgia Fig and  Georgia Miller.

Contest history
 1979 Robby Robinson Classic – 4th
 1980 Frank Zane Invitational – 6th
 1980 US Bodybuilding Championship – 2nd
 1980 International Federation of BodyBuilders (IFBB) Ms. Olympia – 10th
 1981 World Grand Prix – 4th
 1981 Pro World Championship – 7th
 1981 IFBB Ms. Olympia – 5th
 1982 Pro World Championship – 7th
 1982 IFBB Ms. Olympia – 11th
 1983 Pro World Championship – 9th
 1983 IFBB Ms. Olympia – 13th

References

American female bodybuilders
Living people
Year of birth missing (living people)
Professional bodybuilders
21st-century American women